Hercegkút is a village in Borsod-Abaúj-Zemplén County in northeastern Hungary.  Swabians— German immigrants — from the Black Forest (Schwarzwald) region of Germany  settled here and played a major role in the evolution of the village’s viticulture. The cellars of Gombos Hill and Kőporos are UNESCO World Heritage Sites.

History

German Origins 
Hercegkút belonged to the domain of the Rákóczi family. The settlement was established in 1750, when its landlord, Prince Trautson, invited German settlers to the area after the Rákóczi War of Independence, similarly to the nearby villages of Károlyfalva (Karlsdorf) and Rátka (Ratkau). The settlement of the area of today's village took place in the summer of 1750, the early settlers came along the Danube in carts and on foot, but some traveled as far as Buda on rafts. 

The settlement originally bore Prince Trautson’s  name, it was called Trautsondorf (Village of Trautson), or Trauczonfalvá in Hungarian. The name of the settlement was changed to its current name Hercegkút in 1905. 

The German settlers originally came from Baden-Würtenberg - from the settlements of Balgheim, Binsdorf, Binswangen, Bitz, Böttingen, Bubsheim, Deislingen, Denkingen, Dürbheim, Frittlingen, Gosheim, Harpolingen (Bad Säckingen), Hettingen, Illerrieden, Kolbingen, Lautlingen, Luttingen (Laufenburg), Margrethausen, Renquishausen, Wehingen. The settlers were mainly engaged in viticulture.

Founding the Village 
During the first decades, only 80 acres of arable land could be occupied by clearing forests, but half a century later the village has already grown 543 acres. By the 1780s, the population of the village reached 420-430 people, so the intention to build a spacious church worthy of the size of the village arose. The royal license was obtained in 1779, and the landlord's patronage was obtained in 1785.

Religious Background 
The original settlers who founded the village were all Roman Catholic. After demarcating the area of ​​the village, the first building was a small chapel, which was used until 1788. A stone cross can still be seen in front of the chapel's former location.  

The founders of the village belonged to the Roman Catholic Parish of Patak, a state which lasted until the consecration of village's own Roman Catholic church on September 8, 1788 and the founding of its independent parish. Hercegkút's local church customs (e.g. baptisms, marriages, funerals) to this day, carry distinctly Swabian-Alemannic features.

Deportations 
After World War II, the village suffered many hardships due to its German origin. The greatest disaster that affected the entire community was the suffering of the 135 persons (men and women) who were deported to the Soviet Union for forced labor on January 2, 1945. A few days of public work in the match factory in Debrecen is what the villagers were told they were going to do. All able-bodied men aged 17-45 and women aged 18-30 of the village were deported on trains. Instead of Debrecen, two weeks later and 1,600 kilometers further east, they arrived at the Chistyakovo camp in Stalin county, in today's Eastern Ukraine. Instead of the three days of  "public work", they faced forced labor for an unforeseeable period of time in Ukrainian coal mines blown up by withdrawing Nazi troops.

The daily task of the internees was to bring the coal mines into working condition, and later to start production for the Soviet industry. The brigades could not come up from the mine until the prescribed standard was met, if this was not achieved, they sometimes did not see the sunlight for days.

Their food was scarce, and their working conditions were life-threatening. Freed from the damp mines, they walked for hours in frozen wet clothes to the camps. Typhus, malaria, and dysentery took their toll.

Fifteen of the 135 villagers taken from Hercegkút were never able to return home. Those who returned came home mentally broken and physically weakened. The Soviets threatened all returnees: if they dared to speak, their families would suffer the consequences and they would go back to the mine. The last 13 people arrived home on October 20, 1949.

Despite this trauma, the community's sense of Swabian identity remained, it kept its traditions and holidays and today it still keeps 16 accepted holidays, some of which were famous holidays in Germany as well.

Viticulture 
The first residents of the village quickly mastered the local viticultural and wine processing techniques, and for a long time they were the most sought-after vintners in the area.

The harvest of grapes grown on Kőporos, Gombos-hegy and Pogánykút was matured and stored in the two-story cellars at the two ends of the village, in the masterpieces of folk architecture, as early as the 18th century. In 1908, the village became a member of the Tokaj-Hegyalja closed wine region. Since 2002, both rows of cellars have been added to the UNESCO World Heritage List in the cultural landscape category as part of the Tokaj Mountains Wine Region.

Population 

According to the 2011 official census, 89.6% of residents identified themselves as Hungarian, 0.2% as Bulgarian, 0.2% as Polish, 55.6% as German, and 0.2% as Slovak. The religious distribution was as follows: Roman Catholic 75.4%, Reformed 6.1%, Greek Catholic 1.1%, Lutheran 0.2%, non-denominational 1.2% (15.8% did not answer).

German Heritage Preservation 
As a negative effect of the deportations of ethnically German Hungarian citizens by the Soviets following World War II, the German language is no longer spoken in the village as a first language. However, German language teaching and German folk customs and traditions are kept alive through a number of local initiatives and institutions. The village's Gyöngyszem German-Hungarian Kindergarten and the German-Hungarian Elementary School teach children ages 3-12. 

The best representatives of maintaining the German sense of identity are the mixed nationalities choir, which was founded more than 40 years ago, and the traditional dance groups of various age groups, who successfully represent the village at domestic and international cultural festivals.

Roman Catholic Church 
The vast majority of the inhabitants of Hercegkút are Roman Catholic, and this fact plays a prominent role in the life of the community. The church has always been a strong community-shaping force and it still is today in the settlement.

The site of the church was designated in the spring of 1787 at the highest point of the village at that time, and it is likely that construction began in the spring of that year. The locals undertook the cutting of the stones, their delivery, and also contributed to the creation of the church with other manual labor. Construction was completed by the summer of 1788, and the new church was consecrated on September 8 in honor of Our Lady of the Blessed Virgin Mary, which day has been dedicated as an annual day of festivities ever since. The church was built in Baroque style and the tower was later built in 1847 in its present form. The faithful have always paid great attention to the exterior and interior maintenance, renovation, and comfort of the church, the interior painted altars and murals are particularly beautiful.

The frescoes of the church were painted by the Petrasovszky brothers in 1956.

Gombos Hill and Kőporos Cellars 

The UNESCO World Heritage Site Cellars are located at the two ends of the village. They are masterpieces of folk architecture. The characteristic triangular stone cellar facades, originally made of stone, are built 6-8 meters apart. The doorway on the front wall is usually covered by a stone vault, on the top of which the year is often carved into the large, triangular stone, referring to the year the cellar was built and the time of the subsequent renovation. No ventilation shafts were made for the basements, ventilation was provided by the opening above the entrance door. In front of the cellars, carriage roads ran parallel to the facades. A special fungus, cellar mold (cladosporium cellare) is found on the rhyolite tuff walls and the lower part of the cellars boasts an average temperature of 10-12 C°, which lend a special microclimate to the cellars. Most of the cellars consist of one or two "branches", but there are also "three-branched" cellars.

There are 92 cellars on Gombos-hegy and 87 on Kőporos, in four rows one above the other, and the rows of cellars are linked like pearls to the side of the cellar hill.

Based on a decision by UNESCO's in June 2002, the rows of cellars were added to the World Heritage List in the cultural landscape category as part of the Tokaj Mountains.

Swabian Folk House 
The Swabian Landscape House was built next to the village's well-maintained cemetery, where the local Swabian community's period items, farming tools, and memories are presented to visitors.

The characteristics of the local old peasant houses were houses with a common yard and small windows. With its original furnishings, the country house evokes the conditions of life a hundred years ago and offers a glimpse into the past and everyday life of the local people. In the interior of the house, you can see the furniture, tools, and documents kept by the residents of Hercegkút, who for many decades donated  their belongings to furnish the country house.

Kőporos Wine Pavilion 
The building erected in 2022 to evoke the nearby cellars is suitable for wine tastings for up to 50 people, as well as for corporate programs and family events. The pavilion features an exhibition inside, and it is based on several local themes. The pavilion features a kitchen area, rest rooms and a playground as well, making it a family friendly destination.

Memorial to the Deported 
In 2015, on the occasion of the 70th anniversary of the deportation of the able bodied population of the village, the village created a memorial site dedicated to the memory of the deported. On January 2, 1945 men and women between the ages of 18 and 35 who were gathered in the yard of the elementary school were taken to the coal mines of today's Ukraine for several years of forced labor. The memorial of two-figure bronze sculptures in the front garden of the school depicts a woman and a man, standing on railways, seem to be  connected to each other, but are about to part ways. On the south wall of the school building, a memorial plaque preserves the names of those who were taken away on four granite tablets. Fifteen of the 136 young people who were forcibly separated from their families in 1945 were never able to return home to their beloved village.

Gombos Hill Calvary 
The Calvary on top of Gombos Hill was built in 2004 from the donations of local residents and their descendants. The 12 stations start from the row of cellars on Gombos Hill and a meandering path goes up to the top of the mountain. Its stations are illuminated at night. On the very top of the hill stands the Resurrection Chapel, which features a lookout point. The chapel was and consecrated in 2008.

Architect László Rostás, winner of the Pro Architecture Award, prepared the architectural plans. A series of bronze reliefs by Levente Molnár can be seen in the station cabins. At the top of the Chapel, around the dome, one can admire the mountain ranges that surround the village, and enjoy a great view of Hercegkút, Sárospatak, and the nearby and distant Zemplén mountains.

Other Sites 

 Leisure and sports center (at the end of Petőfi Street)
 Pogány-kút and its surroundings
 Gyöngyszem German Elementary School and Kindergarten
 House of Culture (Kulturhaus)
 Bust of sculptor János Götz
 Monument to the villagers deported to the Soviet Union
 Drinking Stag Statue by János Götz

Notable Hungarians from Hercegkút 

 István Braun
 Dr. Mátyás Stumpf
 János Götz
 Dr. István Stumpf

Local Wineries 

 Frikker Winery
 Götz Winery
 Naár Winery
 Bányai Winery
 Matisz Winery
 Espák Winery
 Hutka Winery
 Portius Winery

Civic Organizations 

 Hercegkútért Közalapítvány
 Hercegkút Gyermekeiért Alapítvány
 Heimat Néptánc Egyesület
 Freundschaft Vegyeskórus Egyesület
 Hercegkúti Tornaclub
 Hercegkúti Polgárőr és Tűzoltó Egyesület
 Hercegkúti Világörökségi Pincesorokért Egyesület
 Trautsons Bor és Kultúráért Egyesület

Festivals and Annual Events 

 Hercegkút Day - August 15
 Zemplén Festivál

Coat of Arms 
A rooster with a round base, floating in an off-white shield, holding a bunch of golden grapes in its beak, above it is a holy figure, a child in one hand, a cross in the other.

Sister Cities 

 Obersulm (Germany)
 Beaumont-le-Roger (France)

References

Populated places in Borsod-Abaúj-Zemplén County